The State Life Insurance Corporation of Pakistan, commonly known as State Life or SLIC, is the largest life insurance company of Pakistan, and is one of the largest companies in Pakistan by assets. It maintains an agency network of around 200,000 sales personnel. Although the major function of SLIC is to carry out life insurance business, it is also involved in other business activities such as investment of policyholders’ fund in government securities, stock market and real estate.

The State Life is headed by a chairman, currently Shoaib Javed Hussain. The Chairman is assisted by four directors. The Chairman and directors of State Life are all appointed by the Government of Pakistan.
The Principal Office of State Life is situated in Karachi.

History 
The life insurance business in Pakistan was nationalized in March 1975. Prior to 1972, 36 life insurance companies were involved in the life insurance business. These companies were later merged and placed under three Beema Units; named "A", "B" and "C". Later, these Beema Units were merged on November 1, 1972 into State Life Insurance Corporation of Pakistan.

Subsidiaries 
State Life has the following subsidiaries:
 Alpha Insurance Company Limited
 State Life (Abdullah Haroon Road) Properties (Private) Limited
 State life (Lackie Road) Properties (Private) Limited
 State Assets Management Company Limited (SAMCO)

References

External links 
http://www.statelife.com.pk/Life Insurance Company (State Life) Islamabad, Pakistan.00923333777425
http://www.statelifeplans.com

Companies based in Karachi
Government-owned insurance companies
Pakistani companies established in 1972
Ministry of Commerce (Pakistan)
Life insurance companies
Insurance companies of Pakistan
Financial services companies established in 1972
Government-owned companies of Pakistan